"The unexamined life is not worth living" is a famous dictum supposedly uttered by Socrates at his trial for impiety and corrupting youth, for which he was subsequently sentenced to death.

Rationale

This statement relates to Socrates' understanding and attitude towards death and his commitment to fulfill his goal of investigating and understanding the statement of the Pythia (i.e. that there was no one wiser than Socrates). Socrates understood the Pythia's response to Chaerephon's question as a communication from the god Apollo and this became Socrates's prime directive, his raison d'etre. For Socrates, to be separated from elenchus by exile (preventing him from investigating the statement) was therefore a fate worse than death. Since Socrates was religious and trusted his religious experiences, such as his guiding daimonic voice, he accordingly preferred to continue to seek the truth to the answer to his question, in the after-life, than live a life not identifying the answer on earth.

Meaning

The words were supposedly spoken by Socrates at his trial after he chose death, rather than exile. They represent (in modern terms) the noble choice, that is, the choice of death in the face of an alternative.

Interpretation

Socrates believed that philosophythe study of wisdomwas the most important pursuit above all else. For some, he exemplifies more than anyone else in history the pursuit of wisdom through questioning and logical argument, by examining and by thinking. His "examination" of life in this way spilled out into the lives of others, such that they began their own "examination" of life, but he knew they would all die one day, as saying that a life without philosophyan "unexamined" lifewas not worth living.

References

External links
Plato. Apology 38a. Plato in Twelve Volumes, Vol. 1 translated by Harold North Fowler; Introduction by W.R.M. Lamb. Cambridge, MA, Harvard University Press; London, William Heinemann Ltd. 1966. via Perseus Tufts
J. O. Famakinwa – IS THE UNEXAMINED LIFE WORTH LIVING OR NOT?  Think / Volume 11 / Issue 31 / Summer 2012, pp 97–103 The Royal Institute of Philosophy 2012 
J. M. Ambury – Socrates (469—399 B.C.E.) -2biii - The Unexamined Life in the Internet Encyclopedia of Philosophy

Aphorisms
Socrates
 Philosophical phrases
Quotations from philosophy